D39 is a state road connecting the Aržano and nearby border crossing to Bosnia and Herzegovina D8 state road north of Brela.

The road also serves as a connecting road to the A1 motorway as it is connected to Šestanovac interchange via a short connector road. The northern terminus of the road is located at Aržano border crossing, providing access to Livno in Bosnia and Herzegovina.

The road, as well as all other state roads in Croatia, is managed and maintained by Hrvatske ceste, a state-owned company.

Traffic volume 

Traffic is regularly counted and reported by Hrvatske ceste, operator of the road. Substantial variations between annual (AADT) and summer (ASDT) traffic volumes are attributed to the fact that the road serves as a connection to the A1 motorway and the D8 state road carrying substantial tourist traffic.

Road junctions and populated areas

See also
 Hrvatske autoceste

Maps

Sources

D039
D039